Nathan Harrell East (born December 8, 1955) is an American jazz, R&B, and rock bass player and vocalist. With more than 2,000 recordings, East is one of the most recorded bass players in the history of music. East holds a Bachelor of Arts degree in Music from the University of California, San Diego (1978). He is a founding member of contemporary jazz quartet Fourplay and has recorded, performed, and co-written songs with performers such as Bobby Womack, Eric Clapton, Michael Jackson, Joe Satriani, George Harrison, Ringo Starr, Phil Collins, Stevie Wonder, Toto, Kenny Loggins, Daft Punk, Chick Corea, and Herbie Hancock.

Career

Early life
Nathan Harrell East was born on December 8, 1955 in Philadelphia, Pennsylvania to Thomas and Gwendolyn East. He is one of eight children (five boys and three girls) raised Catholic in San Diego, where the family moved when he was four. He is the younger brother of Msgr Ray East of St Teresa of Avila Church in DC.

East first studied cello from seventh through ninth grade and played in local Horace Mann junior high school's orchestra. At age fourteen he developed an interest in the bass guitar, playing in church with his brothers Raymond and David. He was active in his (Crawford) high school's music programs along with a local top 40 band called "Power". He has said his early influences included Charles Mingus, Ray Brown and Ron Carter on upright bass; and James Jamerson, Paul McCartney and Chuck Rainey on electric bass. He studied music at UC San Diego. Nathan East is also an accomplished amateur magician member of The Magic Castle and the Academy of Magical Arts.

Music career

East is a founding member of the contemporary jazz band Fourplay with Bob James (keyboards), Lee Ritenour on guitar (later replaced by Larry Carlton and Chuck Loeb) and Harvey Mason (drums).

He has worked with Bobby Womack (on the album The Poet), Babyface, Anita Baker, The Bee Gees, Eric Clapton, Steve Winwood, Gail Ann Dorsey, Bryan Ferry, Daft Punk, Herbie Hancock, George Harrison, Michael Jackson, Al Jarreau, Elton John, Quincy Jones, Earth, Wind & Fire, B.B. King, Kenny Loggins, The Love Unlimited Orchestra, The Manhattan Transfer, Ed O'Brien, Laura Pausini, Savage Garden, Sting, Barry White, and Stevie Wonder. He co-wrote the song "Easy Lover" for Phil Collins and Philip Bailey. In 2013, he recorded the bass line for the 2013 hit "Get Lucky" by Daft Punk, which won Grammy Awards for Record of the Year and Best Pop Duo/Group Performance (2014). Since the 1980s, East has been a member of Eric Clapton's studio and touring bands. East was invited to play at We Are One: The Obama Inaugural Celebration at the Lincoln Memorial in Washington, D.C. in 2009.

In early 2010, he was invited to join American Grammy Award-winning rock band Toto on their reunion tour to benefit member Mike Porcaro, who had been diagnosed with Amyotrophic lateral sclerosis. East later joined Toto for their 2011 and 2012 tours as well. He joined Eric Clapton's band for concerts in Japan, Singapore, Thailand, and Dubai in February and March 2014 and again for the Madison Square Garden and Royal Albert Hall concerts of May, 2015.

East's debut self-titled solo album Nathan East was released on March 25, 2014. During recording, he was joined by several of his longtime associates, including Stevie Wonder, Michael McDonald, Eric Clapton, Ray Parker Jr., and Greg Phillinganes.

Equipment

With Yamaha, East developed a custom 5-string bass guitar signature model, the BBNE (modeled after his early 1980s BB5000 5-string bass). The second signature bass, the BBNE2, was released in 2001. A limited edition 30th Anniversary version (the BBNE2 LTD) was released in 2011. He has also used custom 6-string prototypes of his BBNE2 bass guitar between 2003 and 2005, along with his black 1980s LB-1 Motion 5-string bass and a pair of 6-string TRB6P models. Yamaha introduced the NE1 Parametric EQ Pedal, otherwise known as the "Magic Box" in the early 2000s. This pedal essentially gives the player the ability to use the "Nathan East EQ curve" on any bass they choose. East also plays a Yamaha SLB200 Silent Upright Bass.

Awards and honors
 Ivor Novello Award,  British Academy of Songwriters, Composers and Authors for "Easy Lover"
 Most Valuable Player (bass), International Rock Awards 
 Bassist of the Year, U.S. National Smooth Jazz Awards
 Most Valuable Player (bass), N.A.R.A.S. 
 Most Performed Work, ASCAP
 Honored by U.S. Congress, 2007

Discography

Solo

With Fourplay

Live collaborations

References

External links

 Official site
 Online Electric Bass School with Nathan East
 Fourplay homepage
 Interview at Smooth Jazz Notes

1955 births
20th-century American bass guitarists
21st-century American bass guitarists
African-American guitarists
American jazz bass guitarists
American jazz double-bassists
Male double-bassists
American male bass guitarists
American rhythm and blues bass guitarists
American rock bass guitarists
American session musicians
Guitarists from Philadelphia
Living people
Smooth jazz bass guitarists
University of California, San Diego alumni
Jazz musicians from Pennsylvania
21st-century double-bassists
20th-century American male musicians
21st-century American male musicians
American male jazz musicians
Fourplay members
African-American Catholics
20th-century African-American musicians
21st-century African-American musicians
The Love Unlimited Orchestra members